Air Travel is a Chinese airline operating domestic flights from its Kunming Changshui International Airport hub in Yunnan Province. The airline launched operations in May 2016 as Hongtu Airlines and rebranded to "Air Travel" in 2018. The airline moved to Hunan in 2020.

History 
Air Travel, originally named Hongtu Airlines, received preliminary approval from the Civil Aviation Administration of China (CAAC) on 26 March 2015. In October 2015, the airline's livery was revealed.

On 22 December 2015, Hongtu Airlines took delivery of its first aircraft, an Airbus A321 originally destined for UTair Aviation. The aircraft is named Dai after the Dai people, an ethnic minority in Yunnan Province. Hongtu Airlines held an inauguration ceremony on 20 May 2016 and began flights the following day, with the inaugural flight operating between Kunming and Nanchang.

The company is slated to change its name yet again to Hunan Airlines (湖南航空公司) in 2021 following its move to Hunan Province.

Corporate affairs 
Hongtu Airlines is headquartered near Kunming Changshui International Airport. The airline is a joint venture between Kunming Evergreen Financing (30%); local entrepreneur Tang Longcheng (20%); and five other companies, each holding 10%. The parties have invested a total of CNY600 million (USD96.6 million) in the airline.

Destinations 
As of December 2017, Hongtu Airlines flies to the following destinations in China:

Fleet
The Hongtu Airlines fleet consists of the following aircraft as of September 2019:

References

External links 
 
 Photos from inaugural flight, 21 May 2016

Airlines of China
Airlines established in 2015
Companies based in Hunan
Chinese brands
Transport in Yunnan